is the protagonist from Riichiro Inagaki and Boichi's manga series Dr. Stone. Beginning in April 5738 AD, it has been over 3,700 years since a mysterious flash petrified nearly all human life. A 15-year-old genius named Senku Ishigami is suddenly revived to find himself in a world where all traces of human civilization have been eroded by time. Senku sets up a base-camp and begins to study the petrified humans in order to determine the cause of the event.

Senku was created by Inagaki to be a unique type of superhero as, while he does not possess supernatural powers, he stands out through his knowledge of science in order to help create a new civilization. He was based on the antagonistic Agon Kongo from Eyeshield 21 whom the author wanted to portray in a more positive way. In the anime adaptation of the series he is voiced by Yūsuke Kobayashi in Japanese and Aaron Dismuke in the English dub.

Critical response to Senku's character has been positive, appearing in multiple polls of popularity and winning the 4th Crunchyroll Anime Awards of Best Protagonist of the Year. Reviewers enjoyed the character's personality and relationship with the supporting characters as well as his rivalry with Tsukasa Shishio.

Creation and development

Riichiro Inagaki created Senku as an alternative of superheroes rarely explored in fiction as Senku does not possess any supernatural power. Inagaki thought about the average person. For the average person to accomplish something, he would need to keep working and build up towards whatever the goal is. He claims that  he wondered "what's a cool way to portray that average person working hard for their goal?" To amplify that idea of not being able to do anything was the idea of petrification; Senku was created with the idea of being the embodiement of "working diligently by counting for a couple thousand years". Inagaki further wanted to make Senku as a unique character in the manga to the point the other characters are listed as "non-Senku" as he wanted to explore relationships where the cast develop a bond together. 

Originally, Senku was named Gaku as that kanji, 學, stands for "study". Inagaki further claimed that Senku will never develop fantasy powers as it would contradict the realistic setting provided ever since the beginning.

Inagaki professes to use a method of character creation that he refers to as "acting." Essentially, Inagaki often reuses set types of characters in new settings for his works, and in the case of Senku, he essentially reused the character of Agon from his previous serialization, Eyeshield 21. He professes that he likes the type of curt, no-nonsense character that both Agon and Senku embody. Since Agon in only showed that type of character's bad sides, and wanted to do the opposite for Dr. Stone. The scientific focus of the series means that Inagaki has to stick as closely to reality as possible which often needed research. In order to make Senku look cool, Inagaki often asks Boichi to draw a certain background when Senku comes across with finding a new item like "Hydroelectric power plant acquired!!"

In regards to the series' message, Inagaki wanted readers to understand Senku's "power" and his ambitions, using his knowledge of the past to make a stronger future. Artist Boichi said that he related to Senku in regards to the philosophies to life such based on how the artist went from writing in Korea to Japan based on his desires, seeing the manga as a competition to help manga artists in the same way Senku assists society through his skills.

Voice actor Yūsuke Kobayashi mentioned that the intonation of the names were not really clear until they started recording. Kobayashi also voiced the series' mascot, Mecha Senku, who highly resembles the main character. Before voicing him for the English dub, Aaron Dismuke watched the original Japanese episodes, to capture the feeling of the original work, finding it challenging to do. Dismuke further commented that Senku has a tendency to make expositions of creating items such as preparing meals to the point Senku is "all over the place".

Anime director Shinya Iino said "least 50% or more is the character Senku, who's a very unique character." with praise given to Kobayashi's work. As a result, he found Dismuke's work challenging as he had to have the same appeal as Kobayashi. In regards to Senku's characterization, Iino was conflicted with how to modify his facial expressions for emotional scenes. He further compared Senku with Inagaki to the point Senku might be an author avatar of the manga author.

Appearances
Senku is a teenage prodigy who excels in multiple fields of science, with a special love of astronomy and space exploration. In the series' beginning causes Senku and the entire population to be petrified for thousands of years. After awakening in the "Stone World", he sets to restore civilization by reinventing their lost technology and discovering a "cure" for the petrification. Though somewhat arrogant, he is actually very noble and kind-hearted as he considers science as a means to elevate all people and having unshakeable faith in his friends. Senku and Taiju prepare enough revival fluid to free one person from stone, with Taiju choosing Yuzuriha to be first subject. However, the recently revived Tsukasa reveals to Senku his intention to murder petrified adults to create a world free of corrupt adults, clashing with Senku's ideals of reviving everyone. As Senku relinquishes the recipe to save Yuzuriha and is given the choice of either abandoning science or dying, he recalls how he developed his love of science and became friends with Taiju. Refusing to abandon science, Senku prepares to die at Tsukasa's hands.

After faking his death to keep Tsukasa from hunting him, Senku befriends the residents of Ishigami Village and becomes their chief, finding out that he is a legend in the village's community at the same time thanks to the influence through one of the villagers’ ancestors, who happens to be Senku's late adopted father Byakuya, one of the original petrification survivors. He meets sorcerer named Chrome who has come on his own Senku makes him his apprentice. Senku unveils the pile of tungsten for final preparation. After being crushed into a fine powder, it needs to be heated at an extremely high temperature for it to become usable. While Senku readies the tungsten powder, he charges Chrome and Kaseki to create a method of pinpoint high-temperature heating using everything they have learned since Senku's arrival in the village.

Tsukasa and Hyouga prepare for the upcoming attack on Ishigami Village. Senku discuss bringing more men from Tsukasa's Empire to their side. Following several battles, Senku demands a truce from Tsukasa in return for reviving his sister Mirai who Tsukasa learns is alive. Using the revival-fluid, Mirai is revived. Following Hyoga's defeat and Tsukasa entering cryosleep, Senku was able to get the remnants of the Empire of Might to merge with the Kingdom of Science where he leads the Five Wise Generals. Senku calls an assembly where he announces that they will find the secret of the petrification. He also reveals that they will construct a ship to explore the world.

Reception

Senku has been a popular character. Gadget Tsūshin listed Senku's catchphrase "This is exhilarating!" in their 2019 anime buzzwords list. In 2020, Senku was voted the Best Protagonist at the 4th Crunchyroll Anime Awards. He also topped both Western and Eastern Dr. Stone manga polls from 2019. Otaku USA regarded Senku as one of the smartest characters in anime. In another Crunchyroll poll, Senku was voted as the most popular character of the series. He was once again nominated in the 6th Crunchyroll Anime Awards for the category "Best Boy" for his role in the Stone Wars season of Dr. Stone.

Critical response to Senku's character has been generally positive. Spin Maker saw Senku as a likable character as he is "like a cross between MacGyver and Jimmy Neutron". Similarly, Manga.Tokyo called as a mix between Dexter from Dexter's Laboratory and Rintaro Okabe from Steins;Gate finding him as a fun lead, and despite acting like a mad scientist, it is easy to notice that Senku cares about others according to the reviewer. Despite finding his design ridiculous, comparing him to Yugi Mutou's hair, Anime UK News felt that Senku's quest to restore modernity seems possibly as a result of the young demography. Comic Book Resources found Senku to be balanced as despite his intelligence, Senku's strength is often downlplayed for comic relief as he finds it difficult to carry heavy objects. Comic Book Resources made an entire article centered around  Senku, calling him "a shōnen hero at heart though, not the reclusive, eccentric Dr. Frankenstein type" with derivations form little pleasure or meaning from deep personal connections.

Writers have commented on Senku's relationships portrayed in the narrative, most notably the members from Ishigami Village and his rivalry with Tsukasa. Initially, Manga.Tokyo said that the dynamic between Senku and Taiju was similar to Pinky and the Brain series but found the duo dull as there was nothing interesting about their interactions. Anime UK News also saw Senku's quest to increase the firepower of the Ishigami Village as a build up to the eventual second season whihich explores the fight against Tsukasa's forces. Otaquest and IGN praised Senku's characterization and actions in the plot as how he influences his student Chrome who has no knolwedge of Senku's science.

Senku's rivalry with Tsukasa was also the focus of the series' themes involving science against strength with Medium regarded the second anime season as the most important parts it adapted despite noting the final twist their war to be controversial. Anime News Network noted that ever since the first volume, Boichi gave Senku and Tsukasa's rivalry a major effect and noted how Senku still the latter as a murderer even if his rival destroy humans' statues. Comic Book Bin enjoyed the clash in the ninth volume between such forces to the point of calling it the best part of the manga. Both of Senku's voice actors Aaron Dismuke's and Kobayashi's works as Senku's actors have been praised by the media. In an article by AnimeAnime, Senku was listed as the second best Kobayashi character behind Subaru Natsuki from Re:Zero − Starting Life in Another World.

References

External links
  

Crunchyroll Anime Awards winners
Fictional child prodigies
Fictional chemists
Fictional chemical engineers
Teenage characters in anime and manga
Male characters in anime and manga
Fictional Japanese people in anime and manga
Comics characters introduced in 2017
Fictional inventors
Adoptee characters in anime and manga